Under One Roof is a sitcom starring musician and Flavor of Love star Flavor Flav and comic actor Kelly Perine best known for his work on One on One. The series is written by Danielle Quarles. It premiered on MyNetworkTV on April 16, 2008 at 8:00PM Eastern/7:00PM Central.

Under One Roof was one of the last first-run primetime shows to air on MyNetworkTV before the network's change to a syndicated programming service.

Pilot
Calvester (Flavor Flav) and Winston Hill (Kelly Perine) act like they are from opposite sides of the track when they actually just grew up on opposite sides of the room. Years later, Winston is a successful and wealthy real estate developer with a perfect and privileged family, but his life gets interrupted when his street smart, older brother Calvester finally gets out of prison and moves into the mansion since his brother owes him a favor due to an incident where Calvester took the blame for his brother's car crash.

It’s not long before Calvester begins parading his old prison cronies  through the house driving the Hill family crazy - butting heads with Winston’s trophy wife Ashley (Carrie Genzel); 17-year-old daughter, Heather (Marie Michel); and housekeeper Su Ho (Emily Kuroda). Calvester even teaches Winston’s 16-year-old son, Winston Jr. (Jesse Reid) to be a gangster rapper.

Cast
 Flavor Flav as Calvester "Cali Cal" Hill
 Kelly Perine as Winston Hill
 Carrie Genzel as Ashley Hill
 Marie Michel as Heather Hill
 Jesse Reid as Winston Hill Jr.
 Emily Kuroda as Su Ho

Episodes

Ratings

References

External links
 Under One Roof on MyNetwork TV
 
 Under One Roof Official Website

2000s American black sitcoms
2008 American television series debuts
2009 American television series endings
MyNetworkTV original programming
Television shows set in British Columbia